Václav Sivák (born 27 May 1999) is an undefeated Czech professional kickboxer who competes in the welterweight division. He is the current WAKO-PRO World Junior Lightweight Champion.

Biography and career
Václav Sivák was born in Ostrava, Czech Republic and grew up with in an excluded Romani locality in Vítkovice. Sivák started practicing karate at the age 6 however, he was often disqualified for hitting too hard. At the age of 11, he transitioned to Muay Thai. At the age of 16 he moved to Hamr Gym in Ostrava. Under the guidance of his coach Viktor Petrlík he amassed a 94–5 amateur kickboxing record.

In 2019 Sivak became the first Czech to win a gold medal at the senior WAKO World Championships. Sivak next faced Lukas Mandinec at XFN Muay Thai Evening X on February 9, 2019. He won the fight by unanimous decision. Sivak extended his winning streak with an extra round decision win over Mochamed Machaev at XFN Legends on March 29, 2019.

On April 19, 2018, Sivák faced Fang Feida in collaborative event between XFN and Wu Lin Feng. He won the fight by decision.

Sivák faced Benjamin Horvath at Double Red XFN on December 14, 2019. He won the fight by a first-round knockout, stopping Horvath with a left knee to the body.

Sivák faced Ali El saleh at the Night of Warriors event on December 19, 2020, in his sole fight of the year. Sivak won by first knockout flooring his opponent with a left hook to the body.

On January 22, 2021, it was announced that Sivák would face Bailey Sugden at Oktagon Underground: Last Man Standing on February 27, 2021, in the quarterfinals of the Oktagon 70 kg tournament. The bout was contested at 70 kilograms, 6.5 above Sivák's usual weight. He won the fight by unanimous decision. Despite winning the quarterfinal bout, he was forced to withdraw from the tournament due to a leg injury.

On March 18, 2021, Sivák revealed that he would made his Road to ONE debut against Marian-Florin Soare at Night of Warriors 17 on April 24, 2021. He won the fight by a first-round knockout, staggering Soare with a knee to the body, before finishing him with a flurry of punches.

Sivák was booked to face Fouad Djebari Fouad Djebari for the WAKO Pro World K-1 (-64.5 kg) title, his first major professional title, at Yangames Fight Night 9 on July 29, 2021. He withdrew from the bout the week before, in order to fully heal from the injuries he sustained in his fight with Sugden. The title fight was rescheduled for Night of Warriors 4	on November 20, 2021. Sivák won the fight by unanimous decision.

Sivák faced Viktor Mikhailov at Fair Fight XVI on February 12, 2022. He won the fight by unanimous decision. Sivák faced Alexis Laugeois at RFA 5 on October 29, 2022, in his second kickboxing bout of the year. He won the fight by unanimous decision. Sivák next faced Vladimír Lengál at Heroes Gate 26 on November 20, 2022. He won the fight by unanimous decision.

Sivák faced Patrik Záděra for the vacant RFA K-1 -66 kg championship at RFA 7 on December 17, 2022. He won the fight by unanimous decision. Sivák scored the sole knockdown of the fight in the third round, as he dropped his opponent with a head kick.

Sivák was expected to challenge Kiamran Nabati for the Fair Fight featherweight (-65 kg) title at RCC Fair Fight 20 on February 18, 2023. He withdrew from the bout on February 10, 2023, after suffering an undisclosed injury.

Titles and achievements

Professional
World Association of Kickboxing Organizations
 2021 WAKO Pro World -64.5 kg Champion
Real Fight Arena
2022 RFA K-1 -66 kg Championship

Amateur
Czech Federation
 6x Czech K-1 & Muay Thai National Champion
International Federation of Muaythai Associations
 2016 IFMA World Cup in Kazan Junior -63.5 kg 
 2016 IFMA World Championships Junior -63.5 kg 
World Association of Kickboxing Organizations
 2x WAKO Slovak Open K-1 Winner (2018, 2020)
 2x WAKO Czech Open K-1 Winner (2017, 2018)
 2015 WAKO European Cup K-1 Youth 
 2017 WAKO Hungary World Cup K-1 Young Junior -63.5 kg 
 2017 WAKO European Championships K-1 Older Junior -63.5 kg 
 2018 WAKO Hungary World Cup K-1 Older Junior -63.5 kg 
 2018 WAKO European Championships Senior K-1 -63.5 kg 
 2019 WAKO World Championships Senior K-1 -63.5 kg 
 2020 WAKO WGP -67 kg Champion 
World Martial Arts Committee
 2019 WMAC World Games K-1 -65 kg

Fight record

|-  style="text-align:center; background:#cfc" 
| 2022-12-17 || Win ||align=left| Patrik Záděra || RFA 7 || Prague, Czech Republic || Decision (Unanimous) || 5 || 3:00 
|-
! style=background:white colspan=9 |

|-  style="text-align:center; background:#cfc" 
| 2022-11-20 || Win ||align=left| Vladimír Lengál || Heroes Gate 26 || Prague, Czech Repbulic|| Decision (Unanimous) || 3 || 3:00

|-  style="text-align:center; background:#cfc" 
| 2022-10-29 || Win ||align=left| Alexis Laugeois || Real Fight Arena 5 || Brno, Czech Repbulic|| Decision (Unanimous) || 3 ||3:00

|-  style="text-align:center; background:#cfc" 
| 2022-02-12 || Win ||align=left| Viktor Mikhailov || Fair Fight 16 || Yekaterinburg, Russia || Decision (unanimous) || 3 || 3:00

|-  style="text-align:center; background:#cfc;"
| 2021-11-20|| Win ||align=left| Fouad Djebari || Night of Warriors || Liberec, Czech Republic || Decision (unanimous) || 5 || 3:00  
|-
! style=background:white colspan=9 |

|-  style="text-align:center; background:#cfc;"
| 2021-04-24|| Win ||align=left| Marian-Florin Soare || Road to ONE 8: Night of Warriors || Prague, Czech Republic || KO (body knee)|| 1 || 1:36

|-  style="text-align:center; background:#cfc;"
| 2021-02-27 || Win ||align=left| Bailey Sugden || Oktagon Underground - Last Man Standing, Quarter Final || Prague, Czech Republic || Decision (majority) || 3 || 3:00
|-
! style=background:white colspan=9 |

|-  style="text-align:center; background:#cfc;"
| 2020-12-19 || Win ||align=left| Ali El Saleh || Night of Warriors || Prague, Czech Republic || KO (body shot) || 1 || 2:30

|-  style="text-align:center; background:#cfc;"
| 2019-12-14|| Win ||align=left| Benjamin Horvath || Double Red XFN || Bratislava, Slovakia || KO (body knee) || 1 || 2:39

|-  style="text-align:center; background:#cfc;"
| 2019-11-16|| Win ||align=left| Deo Phetsangkhat || Battle of Frýdlant 9 || Frýdlant, Czech Republic || Decision || 3 || 3:00

|-  style="text-align:center; background:#cfc;"
| 2019-09-20|| Win ||align=left| Samuel Hadzima || XFN Legends || Prague, Czech Republic || Decision (unanimous) || 3 || 3:00

|-  style="text-align:center; background:#cfc;"
| 2019-03-29|| Win ||align=left| Mochamed Machaev || XFN Legends || Prague, Czech Republic || Ext. R Decision || 4 ||3:00

|-  style="text-align:center; background:#cfc;"
| 2019-02-09|| Win ||align=left| Lukas Mandinec || XFN Muay Thai Evening X || Slovakia || Decision || 3 ||3:00
 
|-  style="text-align:center; background:#cfc;"
| 2018-04-19|| Win ||align=left| Fang Feida || WLF: Czech Republic vs. China || Prague, Czech Republic || Decision || 3 ||3:00

|-
| colspan=9 | Legend:    

|-  style="text-align:center; background:#cfc;"
| 2019-10-25|| Win ||align=left| Tlemissov Chingiskhan || 2019 WAKO World Championships, Final || Sarajevo, Bosnia and Herzegovina || Decision (split)|| 3 || 2:00 
|-
! style=background:white colspan=9 |

|-  style="text-align:center; background:#cfc;"
| 2019-10-|| Win ||align=left| Antoine Habash || 2019 WAKO World Championships, Semi Final || Sarajevo, Bosnia and Herzegovina || Decision (unanimous) || 3 || 2:00

|-  style="text-align:center; background:#cfc;"
| 2019-10-|| Win||align=left| Ivan Avdeev || 2019 WAKO World Championships, Quarter Final || Sarajevo, Bosnia and Herzegovina || Decision (split) || 3 || 2:00

|-  style="text-align:center; background:#cfc;"
| 2019-10-|| Win ||align=left| Jorge Ricardo Menezes da Silva || 2019 WAKO World Championships, Second Round || Sarajevo, Bosnia and Herzegovina || Decision (unanimous) || 3 || 2:00

|-  style="text-align:center; background:#cfc;"
| 2019-10-22|| Win ||align=left| Elmir Aliyev || 2019 WAKO World Championships, First Round || Sarajevo, Bosnia and Herzegovina ||Decision (unanimous) || 3 || 2:00

|-  style="text-align:center; background:#fbb;"
| 2018-10-|| Loss ||align=left| Orfan Sananzade || 2018 WAKO European Championships, Semi Final || Bratislava, Slovakia || Decision (unanimous) || 3 || 2:00
|-
! style=background:white colspan=9 |
|-  style="text-align:center; background:#cfc;"
| 2018-10-|| Win ||align=left| Yury Zhukouski || 2018 WAKO European Championships, Quarter Final || Bratislava, Slovakia || Decision (split) || 3 || 2:00

|-  style="text-align:center; background:#cfc;"
| 2018-10-|| Win||align=left| Artur Baptista || 2018 WAKO European Championships, First Round || Bratislava, Slovakia || Decision (unanimous) || 3 || 2:00

|-  style="text-align:center; background:#cfc;"
| 2017-09-10 || Win ||align=left| Oleksandr Hoshev || 2017 WAKO European Junior Championships, Final || Skopje, Macedonia || Decision (unanimous)|| 3 || 2:00 
|-
! style=background:white colspan=9 |

|-  style="text-align:center; background:#cfc;"
| 2017-09-08 || Win ||align=left| Konstantin Mihailov || 2017 WAKO European Junior Championships, Semifinal || Skopje, Macedonia || Decision (unanimous)|| 3 || 2:00 
|-

|-  style="text-align:center; background:#cfc;"
| 2017-09-06 || Win ||align=left| Kamil Kryzaniak || 2017 WAKO European Junior Championships, Quarterfinal || Skopje, Macedonia || Decision (unanimous)|| 3 || 2:00

|-  style="text-align:center; background:#cfc;"
| 2017-05-21 || Win ||align=left| Ádám Sándor || 2017 Hungarian Kickboxing World Cup, Final || Budapest, Hungary|| Decision (unanimous)|| 3 || 2:00 
|-
! style=background:white colspan=9 |
|-

|-  style="text-align:center; background:#cfc;"
| 2017-05-20 || Win ||align=left| Abu Raiya Anan || 2017 Hungarian Kickboxing World Cup, Semifinal || Budapest, Hungary|| Decision (unanimous)|| 3 || 2:00 
|-

|-
| colspan=9 | Legend:

Professional boxing record

Exhibition boxing record

References

Czech male kickboxers
Welterweight kickboxers
1999 births
Living people
Sportspeople from Ostrava
Czech people of Romani descent
Romani sportspeople
Kickboxing champions